Generation Loss is a novel  by American writer Elizabeth Hand.

Reception
The Washington Post states that the "portrayal of gritty suffering is as strong as its fantastical elements"

Awards
Generation Loss won the first Shirley Jackson Award. It also shortlisted for the Believer Book Award.

References

External links
Full review at the Washington Post
Bostonist reviews the book

2007 American novels
Works by Elizabeth Hand
Small Beer Press books